John FitzGerald, 15th Knight of Kerry (1706 – 10 June 1741) was an Irish politician and hereditary knight.

He was the older son of Maurice FitzGerald, 14th Knight of Kerry, and his wife Elizabeth Crosbie, second daughter of David Crosbie. His younger brother was Robert FitzGerald. In 1728, FitzGerald entered the Irish House of Commons and sat for Dingle until his death. One year later, he succeeded his father as Knight of Kerry.

On 12 April 1732, FitzGerald married Margaret Deane, youngest daughter of Joseph Deane, Chief Baron of the Irish Exchequer, and by her, he had a daughter and a son. FitzGerald died at The Grove, Dingle in 1741 and was succeeded in his title by his only son Maurice.

References 

 (Ireland)

Irish knights
John
1706 births
1741 deaths
Irish MPs 1727–1760
Members of the Parliament of Ireland (pre-1801) for County Kerry constituencies